Nicolaes van Helt Stockade (1614–1669), was a Dutch Golden Age painter.

Biography

According to Houbraken, Joost van den Vondel made a poem about him.

Stockade served as a court painter to King Louis XIII between 1637 and 1645. According to the RKD he became a master in the Antwerp Guild of Saint Luke in 1646 and worked on the city hall of Nijmegen and the Amsterdam City Hall.

References

1614 births
1669 deaths
Dutch Golden Age painters
Dutch male painters
People from Nijmegen
Painters from Antwerp